The 1917 SAPFL season was the 2nd season of the South Australian Patriotic Football League, a competition formed in the absence of the South Australian Football League during World War I. The SAFL was opposed to the formation of the Patriotic League and refused to recognise it during and after World War I.

References

SAFL